The Karoninka people (also called Karone) are an ethnic group in West Africa related to the Jola. They live mainly in Casamance, Senegal, on the right bank of the Casamance River and the islands in the mouth, but also in The Gambia.

Population
They represent approximately 1% of the population of Senegal.

See also
 Carabane
 Demographics of Senegal

External links
  Wuli, Elan & Inerti: The Karoninka Approach to Sustainability

Ethnic groups in Senegal
Ethnic groups in the Gambia